Wolverhampton & Bilston Athletics Club was formed in 1967 and has its home ground at Aldersley Leisure Village formally Aldersley Stadium in Aldersley, Wolverhampton, England.

It won the Men's National League Division One from 1975 to 1982 and the Men's National Cup 1976, 1977, 1979 and 1980.

History
Wolverhampton Athletics Club was formed in 1943. In 1943 they merged with Penn Harriers to form Wolverhampton Harriers. 
In 1967 after a local government reorganisation the two local athletic clubs, Wolverhampton Harriers and Bilston Town Athletic Club merged to form Wolverhampton and Bilston Club.

Honours

Senior Men:

 British Athletics League
First Place: 1975, 1976, 1977, 1978, 1979, 1980, 1981, 1982
Second Place: 1974, 1984, 1985
Third Place: 1972, 1973, 1986, 1987

Senior Women:

Notable Athletes

Olympians

Other
Mike Bull
Phil Lewis

References

External links
 Wolverhampton & Bilston Website

Sport in Wolverhampton
Athletics clubs in England
1967 establishments in England